Fairlie is a Scottish surname. Notable people with the surname include:

Fairlie-Cuninghame baronets
Andrew Fairlie (actor), Scottish actor
Andrew Fairlie (chef), Scottish chef
Brian Fairlie (born 1948), retired tennis player from New Zealand
Gerard Fairlie (1899–1983), Scottish author and scriptwriter
Henry Fairlie (1924–1990), British political journalist and social critic
Jamie Fairlie (born 2 August 1957), former Scottish footballer
Jim Fairlie (born 1940), Scottish politician and financial analyst
John Archibald Fairlie (1872–1947), Scottish political scientist
Kristin Fairlie (born 1982), Canadian actress
Margaret Fairlie (1891–1963), Scottish academic and gynaecologist
Peter Fairlie (born 1957), Scottish squash player
Reginald Fairlie (1883–1952), Scottish architect
Robert Francis Fairlie (born 1830/1831), Scottish railway engineer

See also
Fairley
Farley

fr:Fairlie